Aiteta damnipennis is a moth of the family Nolidae first described by Francis Walker in 1865. It is found in Sri Lanka, India, Peninsular Malaysia, Sumatra, Borneo and Sulawesi.

Larval food plant is Terminalia species.

References

Moths of Asia
Moths described in 1865
Nolidae